Availles may refer to several communes in France:
 Availles-en-Châtellerault, in the Vienne department
 Availles-Limouzine, in the Vienne department
 Availles-sur-Seiche, in the Ille-et-Vilaine department
 Availles-Thouarsais, in the Deux-Sèvres department